The handsome sunbird (Aethopyga bella) is a species of bird in the family Nectariniidae. It is endemic to the Philippines.

Its natural habitats are subtropical or tropical moist lowland forests and subtropical or tropical moist montane forests.

References

handsome sunbird
Endemic birds of the Philippines
handsome sunbird
Taxonomy articles created by Polbot